Following his father's death in December 1871, W. G. Grace increased his involvement with the United South of England Eleven (USEE) in order to provide more income for his mother, with whom he and his younger brother Fred were still living. Grace continued to play regularly for Gloucestershire and Marylebone Cricket Club (MCC) and, when required, by the Gentlemen. In the late summer of 1872, he toured North America with a team of players who all had amateur status. In the 1873 season, he performed his first season "double" of 1,000 runs and 100 wickets.

Background
Following the death of their father, Grace and his brother Fred still lived with their mother at Downend.  Their father had left just enough to maintain the family home but the onus was now on the brothers to increase their earnings from cricket to pay for their medical studies (Fred started his in the autumn of 1872).  They achieved this through their involvement as match organisers of the United South of England Eleven (USEE) which played six matches in the 1872 season including games in Edinburgh and Glasgow, Grace's first visit to Scotland.

1872 was a wet summer and Grace ended his season in early August so that he could join the tour of North America.  He made 22 first-class appearances, scoring 1,561 runs at 53.82 including 6 centuries with a highest score of 170 not out and taking 27 catches.  He took 62 wickets at 11.87 including 9 instances of 5 wickets in an innings, with a best analysis of 8–33, and 3 instances of 10 wickets in a match.  He topped the batting averages ahead of John Selby, E.M. Grace, Richard Daft, William Yardley and A.N. Hornby.  His nearest challengers among runscorers were Richard Humphrey, Jupp and Lockwood.  Grace's 62 wickets placed him 5th in that list, once again well behind the leader Southerton who took 169.  James Lillywhite and the two Shaws were also ahead of Grace and just behind him were Emmett and Street.  The best average was William McIntyre's 5.65.

Gloucestershire played seven inter-county matches and had mixed success.  Although they defeated both Surrey and Yorkshire by an innings, they lost another match against Surrey and had three draws including two against Nottinghamshire.  Medium pacer Thomas Lang, who played for the county till 1875, made his debut.

Grace made three overseas tours during his career.  The first was to the United States and Canada with R.A. Fitzgerald's team in August and September 1872.  The expenses of this tour were paid by the Montreal Club who had written to Fitzgerald the previous winter and invited him to form a team.  Grace and his all-amateur colleagues made "short work of the weak teams" they faced.

The team included two other future England captains in Hornby, who became a rival of Grace in future years; and the Honourable George Harris, the future Lord Harris, who became a very close friend and a most useful ally.  The team met in Liverpool on 8 August and sailed on the SS Sarmatian, docking at Quebec on 17 August.  Simon Rae recounts that the bond between Grace and Harris was forged by their mutual sea-sickness.  Matches were played in Montreal, Ottawa, Toronto, London, New York City, Philadelphia and Boston.  The team sailed back from Quebec on 27 September and arrived at Liverpool on 8 October.

The tour was "a high point of (Grace's) early years" and he "retained fond memories of it" for the rest of his life, calling it "a prolonged and happy picnic" in his ghost-written Reminiscences.

Grace became the first batsman to score a century before lunch in a first-class match when he made 134 for Gentlemen of the South versus Players of the South at The Oval in 1873.  In the same season, he became the first player ever to complete the "double" of 1,000 runs and 100 wickets in a season.  He went on to do that eight times in all:
 1873 – 2,139 runs and 106 wickets
 1874 – 1,664 runs and 140 wickets
 1875 – 1,498 runs and 191 wickets
 1876 – 2,622 runs and 129 wickets
 1877 – 1,474 runs and 179 wickets
 1878 – 1,151 runs and 152 wickets
 1885 – 1,688 runs and 117 wickets
 1886 – 1,846 runs and 122 wickets

Grace made 20 first-class appearances in 1873, scoring 2,139 runs at 71.30 including 7 centuries with a highest score of 192 not out and taking 29 catches.  He took 106 wickets at 12.92 including 10 instances of 5 wickets in an innings, with a best analysis of 10–92, and 3 instances of 10 wickets in a match.  No other batsman came near his runs or average, the best of the rest being Jupp, Fred Grace, William Oscroft and Isaac Walker.  Grace's 106 wickets was 4th best behind Southerton, Alfred Shaw and James Lillywhite with Allen Hill in fifth place.  William McIntyre again had the best average with 8.38.

1873 was the year that some semblance of organisation was brought into county cricket with the introduction of a residence qualification.  This was aimed principally at England's outstanding bowler James Southerton who had been playing for both Surrey and Sussex, having been born in one and living in the other.  Southerton chose to play for his county of residence, Surrey, from then on but remained the country's top bowler.  The counties agreed on residence but not on a means of deciding a championship and so the title remained an unofficial award until 1889.  Gloucestershire had a very strong claim to this unofficial title in 1873 but consensus was that they shared it with Nottinghamshire.  These two did not play each other and both were unbeaten in six matches, but Nottinghamshire won five and Gloucestershire won four.

References

External links
 CricketArchive – W.G. Grace

Bibliography

 
 
 
 
 
 
 
 
 

English cricket seasons in the 19th century
1872